Gentiana  is a genus of flowering plants belonging to the gentian family (Gentianaceae), the tribe Gentianeae, and the monophyletic subtribe Gentianinae. With about 400 species it is considered a large genus. They are notable for their mostly large, trumpet-shaped flowers, which are often of an intense blue.

The genus name is a tribute to Gentius, an Illyrian king who may have been the discoverer of tonic properties in gentians.

Habitat

This is a cosmopolitan genus, occurring in alpine habitats in temperate regions of Asia, Europe and the Americas. Some species also occur in northwestern Africa, eastern Australia, and New Zealand. They are annual, biennial, and perennial plants. Some are evergreen, others are not.

Many gentians are difficult to grow outside their wild habitat, but several species are available in cultivation. Gentians are fully hardy and can grow in full sun or partial shade. They grow in well-drained, neutral-to-acid soils rich in humus.  They are popular in rock gardens.

Uses

Many beverages are made with gentian root. Gentiana lutea is used to produce gentian, a distilled beverage produced in the Alps and in the Auvergne. Some species are harvested for the manufacture of apéritifs, liqueurs, and tonics.

Gentian root is a common beverage flavouring for bitters. The soft drink Moxie contains gentian root. The French apéritif Suze is made with gentian. Americano apéritifs contain gentian root for bitter flavoring. It is an ingredient in the Italian liqueur Aperol.  It is also used as the main flavor in the German after-dinner digestif called Underberg, and the main ingredient in Angostura bitters and Peychaud's Bitters.

The bitter principle of gentian root is primarily gentiopicrin (also called gentiopicroside), a glycoside. A 2007 paper by a Japanese group identified 23 compounds in fresh gentian root. Gentiopicrin was absent from fresh root, so it possibly develops during drying and storage of the root.

Gentian has had a limited use in perfumery, most notably as a glycerine soap (Crabtree & Evelyn) and a perfume (Corday's Possession, 1937).

Pharmacological uses 

Great yellow gentian (Gentiana lutea) is used in herbal medicine for digestive problems, fever, hypertension, muscle spasms, parasitic worms, wounds, cancer, sinusitis, and malaria, although studies have shown minimal efficacy beyond that of a placebo with regard to the treatment of anxiety and ADHD in children. It has been studied and proven in effectively managing dyspepsia.

Gentiana punctata leaves and roots have been used in traditional Austrian medicine internally and externally as liqueur or tea for disorders of the gastrointestinal tract, skin, locomotor system, liver and bile, and for pediatric problems, fever, flu, rheumatism, and gout.

Gentiana purpurea, Gentiana punctata, and Gentiana pannonica are used to produce bitter schnapps, traditionally used as a digestive aid. In Ayurvedic medicine the endangered Indian gentian Gentiana kurroo has been used as a medical herb, but has been replaced with the Himalayan plant Picrorhiza kurroa, Plantaginaceae or Picrorhiza scrophulariiflora (胡黃蓮 Hú Huáng Lián) from traditional Chinese medicine.

Symbolism

The gentian flower was used as the emblem of the Minamoto clan, one of the four great clans that dominated Japanese politics during the Heian period and went on to establish the first Shogunate in the aftermath of the Genpei War. It is the official flower of the German-speaking community of Belgium.

Species

General
Gentians have oppositely arranged leaves, sometimes in a basal rosette. The trumpet-shaped flowers are usually deep blue or azure, but can be white, cream, yellow, or red. Many species are polymorphic with respect to flower color, bearing flowers of different colors. Blue-flowered species predominate in the Northern Hemisphere, with red-flowered species dominant in the Andes, where bird pollination is probably more often favored by natural selection. White-flowered species are scattered throughout the range of the genus but dominate in New Zealand. Most flowers are pentamerous, with five lobes in the corolla and five sepals. A few species have four to seven flower parts. The corolla has folds called plicae between the lobes. The style is short or absent. The ovary is mostly sessile and has nectary glands.

List of accepted species 

Gentiana acaulis – stemless gentian
Gentiana affinis – pleated gentian
Gentiana alata
Gentiana alba – plain gentian
Gentiana albicalyx
Gentiana albomarginata
Gentiana algida – whitish gentian
Gentiana alii
Gentiana alpina – alpine gentian
Gentiana alsinoides

Gentiana altigena
Gentiana altorum
Gentiana amplicrater
Gentiana andrewsii – closed bottle gentian
Gentiana angustifolia
Gentiana anisostemon
Gentiana aperta
Gentiana apiata
Gentiana aquatica
Gentiana arenicola
Gentiana arethusae
Gentiana argentea
Gentiana arisanensis
Gentiana aristata
Gentiana asclepiadea – willow gentian
Gentiana asterocalyx
Gentiana atlantica
Gentiana atuntsiensis
Gentiana austromontana – Appalachian gentian
Gentiana autumnalis – pinebarren gentian
Gentiana axilliflora
Gentiana baeuerlenii (N.S.W)
Gentiana bambuseti
Gentiana bavarica – Bavarian gentian
Gentiana beamanii
Gentiana bella
Gentiana bicuspidata
Gentiana boissieri
Gentiana bokorensis
Gentiana borneensis
Gentiana boryi
Gentiana brachyphylla
Gentiana bredboensis (N.S.W.)
Gentiana bryoides
Gentiana burseri
Gentiana cachemirica
Gentiana caelestis
Gentiana caeruleogrisea
Gentiana caliculata
Gentiana calycosa – Rainier pleated gentian
Gentiana capitata
Gentiana carinata
Gentiana carinicostata
Gentiana caryophyllea
Gentiana catesbaei – Elliott's gentian
Gentiana cephalantha
Gentiana cephalodes
Gentiana chateri
Gentiana chinensis
Gentiana choanantha
Gentiana chosenica
Gentiana chungtienensis
Gentiana clarkei
Gentiana clausa – bottled gentian
Gentiana clusii – trumpet gentian
Gentiana confertifolia
Gentiana coronata
Gentiana crassa
Gentiana crassicaulis
Gentiana crassula
Gentiana crassuloides
Gentiana cristata
Gentiana cruciata – cross gentian
Gentiana cruttwellii
Gentiana cuneibarba
Gentiana dahurica
Gentiana damyonensis
Gentiana davidii
Gentiana decemfida
Gentiana decora – showy gentian
Gentiana decorata
Gentiana decumbens
Gentiana delavayi
Gentiana deltoidea
Gentiana dendrologii
Gentiana densiflora
Gentiana depressa
Gentiana dinarica
Gentiana divaricata
Gentiana diversifolia
Gentiana douglasiana – swamp gentian
Gentiana doxiongshangensis
Gentiana dschungarica
Gentiana duclouxii
Gentiana durangensis
Gentiana ecaudata
Gentiana elmeriana
Gentiana elwesii
Gentiana emodi
Gentiana ettingshausenii
Gentiana exigua
Gentiana expansa
Gentiana faucipilosa
Gentiana fieldiana
Gentiana filistyla
Gentiana flavomaculata
Gentiana flexicaulis
Gentiana formosa
Gentiana forrestii
Gentiana franchetiana
Gentiana fremontii – moss gentian
Gentiana frigida
Gentiana froelichii – Karawanken gentian
Gentiana futtereri
Gentiana gelida
Gentiana gentilis
Gentiana georgei
Gentiana gilvostriata
Gentiana glauca – pale gentian
Gentiana grandiflora
Gentiana grata
Gentiana grumii
Gentiana gyirongensis
Gentiana handeliana
Gentiana haraldi-smithii
Gentiana harrowiana
Gentiana haynaldii
Gentiana heleonastes
Gentiana helophila
Gentiana hesseliana
Gentiana hexaphylla
Gentiana himalayensis
Gentiana hirsuta
Gentiana hohoxiliensis
Gentiana hooperi
Gentiana hugelii
Gentiana huxleyi
Gentiana infelix
Gentiana intricata
Gentiana Inverleith
Gentiana jamesii
Gentiana jarmilae
Gentiana jingdongensis
Gentiana jouyana
Gentiana kaohsiungensis
Gentiana kauffmanniana
Gentiana khammouanensis
Gentiana kurroo
Gentiana kwangsiensis
Gentiana lacerulata
Gentiana laevigata
Gentiana langbianensis
Gentiana lateriflora
Gentiana lawrencii
Gentiana laxiflora
Gentiana leptoclada
Gentiana leroyana
Gentiana leucomelaena
Gentiana lhassica
Gentiana liangshanensis
Gentiana licentii
Gentiana ligustica
Gentiana linearis – narrowleaf gentian
Gentiana lineolata
Gentiana linoides
Gentiana loerzingii
Gentiana longicollis
Gentiana loureiroi
Gentiana lowryi
Gentiana lutea – great yellow gentian
Gentiana lycopodioides
Gentiana macrophylla – bigleaf gentian
Gentiana makinoi
Gentiana microdonta
Gentiana newberryi – Newberry's gentian
Gentiana nipponica
Gentiana nivalis – snow gentian
Gentiana nubigena
Gentiana ochroleuca
Gentiana olgae
Gentiana olivieri
Gentiana orbicularis – round leaved gentian
Gentiana ornata
Gentiana pannonica – brown gentian
Gentiana paradoxa
Gentiana parryi – Parry's gentian
Gentiana pedicellata
Gentiana pennelliana – wiregrass gentian
Gentiana phyllocalyx
Gentiana platypetala – broadpetal gentian
Gentiana plurisetosa – bristly gentian
Gentiana pneumonanthe – marsh gentian
Gentiana prolata
Gentiana prostrata – pygmy gentian
Gentiana przewalskii
Gentiana pterocalyx
Gentiana puberulenta – downy gentian
Gentiana pumila
Gentiana punctata – spotted gentian
Gentiana purpurea – purple gentian
Gentiana pyrenaica
Gentiana quadrifolia
Gentiana rigescens
Gentiana rostanii
Gentiana rubricaulis – closed gentian
Gentiana saponaria – harvestbells gentian
Gentiana saxosa
Gentiana scabra
Gentiana scarlatina
Gentiana sceptrum – king's scepter gentian
Gentiana sedifolia
Gentiana septemfida – crested gentian
Gentiana setigera – Mendocino gentian
Gentiana setulifolia
Gentiana sikkimensis
Gentiana sikokiana
Gentiana sino-ornata – showy Chinese gentian
Gentiana siphonantha
Gentiana speciosa
Gentiana squarrosa
Gentiana stictantha
Gentiana stragulata
Gentiana straminea
Gentiana tenuifolia
Gentiana terglouensis – Triglav gentian
Gentiana ternifolia
Gentiana tianshanica – Tienshan gentian
Gentiana trichotoma
Gentiana triflora
Gentiana trinervis
Gentiana tubiflora
Gentiana uchiyamai
Gentiana ulmeri
Gentiana uniflora
Gentiana urnula
Gentiana utriculosa – bladder gentian
Gentiana vandellioides
Gentiana vandewateri
Gentiana veitchiorum
Gentiana venosa
Gentiana venusta
Gentiana verna – spring gentian
Gentiana vernayi
Gentiana viatrix
Gentiana villifera
Gentiana villosa – striped gentian
Gentiana waltonii
Gentiana walujewii
Gentiana wangchukii
Gentiana wasenensis
Gentiana wilsonii
Gentiana winchuanensis
Gentiana wingecarribiensis (N.S.W.)
Gentiana wissmannii (N.S.W)
Gentiana wootchuliana – Korean alpine gentian
Gentiana xanthonannos
Gentiana yakushimensis
Gentiana yokusai
Gentiana yunnanensis
Gentiana zekuensis
Gentiana zollingeri

Formerly placed here

Gentianopsis crinita (fringed gentian), as Gentiana crinita

Cultivation

Several gentian species may be found in cultivation, and are valued for the unusual intensity of their blue flowers. They have a reputation for being difficult to grow. All require similar conditions – moist, rich, free-draining soil with an acid to neutral pH. They include:

G. acaulis
G. asclepiadea
G. paradoxa
G. septemfida
G. sino-ornata

In addition, the following cultivars, of mixed or uncertain parentage, have gained the Royal Horticultural Society’s Award of Garden Merit: 
 'Blue Silk' 
'Shot Silk' 
'Strathmore'

References

Further reading

External links 

 
 

 
Gentianaceae genera
Flora of Europe
Flora of North America
Flora of temperate Asia
Taxa named by Carl Linnaeus